The VERA passive radar (known as Věra in Czech) is an electronic support measures (ESM) system that uses measurements of time difference of arrival (TDOA) of pulses at three or four sites to accurately detect and track airborne emitters. It is reportedly able to detect military "invisible aircraft".

Mode of operation

The deployed system typically comprises a central site (containing the signal processing equipment and an ESM receiver) and two or three side sites containing only an ESM receiver.  The side sites relay the signals received to the central site over a point-to-point microwave link.  The central site uses the known propagation delay from the side sites to estimate the TDOA of the pulses at each site.

The TDOA of a pulse between one side site and the central site locates the target on a hyperboloid.  A second side site provides a second TDOA and hence a second hyperboloid.  The intersection of these two hyperboloids places the target on a line, providing a 2D measurement of the target's location (no height).

A third side-site provides a third hyperboloid, which, when intersected with the line provided by the other two side sites, provides a full 3D location of the target.  This process is known as multilateration.

The height of a target with an SSR Mode C or Mode S transponder can also be provided by decoding the Mode C or Mode S response directly, which is the normal mode of operation for the civilian VERA-AP system.

System accuracy
System accuracy is typically better than a microwave surveillance radar, and is a function of the deployment geometry, the inherent timing accuracy of the central site, the bandwidth of the pulse being detected and the signal-to-noise ratio. Wider separations of the side sites from the central site provide better accuracies – but at the expense of a reduced area of common coverage. Typically side sites are deployed 15–40 km from the central site, providing a reasonable compromise of coverage and accuracy.

The system is generally line-of-sight limited, with a nominal range of 450 km, the normal radio horizon. Detection of targets is within a sector of approximately 120 degrees, although IFF and SSR targets are detected using a dedicated omnidirectional antenna, and hence may be seen over 360 degrees. Up to 200 targets can be automatically tracked simultaneously, with an output rate adjustable from 1 to 5 seconds.

Exploited emitters
The current generation sensor can only detect and track pulsed emissions, due to the requirement to measure the time of arrival of pulses. The receivers operate in the frequency range of 1-18 GHz and typically exploit secondary surveillance radar (SSR) transponders, identify friend or foe (IFF) transponders, airborne radars, weather radars, tactical air navigation (TACAN) transponders, distance measurement equipment (DME) beacons, digital communications signals and pulsed jamming signals.

Versions

VERA is supplied in a number of versions. VERA-AP is the civilian long-range air traffic control (ATC) version, which only exploits civilian SSR transponders at 1030 and 1090 MHz.

VERA-E is the export version of the military ESM version of the system, also referred to as the VERA-S/M in its national mobile version. In addition, the shorter range VERA-P3D system is marketed for highly accurate monitoring of transponder-equipped ground vehicle movement at airports. The manufacturers also market an ESM triangulation system known as BORAP.

Data Patterns Pvt Ltd, India has also established a comfortable lead with its counterpart internationally.

Czech company ERA in cooperation with the German SMAG introduced a brand new mobile antenna mast for its system VERA-NG. The prototype is due to be finished in Q1/2017 and be ready for first deliveries at the end of this year.

Exports

Public domain literature claim VERA-E systems have been exported to Malaysia, Estonia, Pakistan and the United States. Newspaper reports also claimed that in January 2004 the Czech defence sales company, Omnipol, received licence to sell six systems to China. However, US government pressure on the Czech government resulted in the cancellation of this contract. Civil systems have been widely exported throughout Europe.

Within the Czech Republic, a mobile VERA-E unit is operated by the 53rd Passive Radiotechnical Reconnaissance System and Electronic Warfare Centre at Planá near České Budějovice.

History
VERA is the latest in a long history of Czech ESM TDOA systems. The first system developed by the Czech army in 1963 was known as PRP-1 Kopáč which could track 6 targets.

This was followed by KRTP-81 Ramona (NATO reporting name Soft Ball) in 1979, which could track 20 targets, and KRTP-86 Tamara (NATO reporting name Trash Can) in 1987, which could simultaneously track 23 radar targets and 48 IFF targets.

These were widely exported to the former Soviet Union and beyond. These predecessors were manufactured by the state company Tesla, which collapsed after the Velvet Revolution (1989). Lead engineers from the former Tesla company formed the ERA Company in Pardubice which produces the current generation VERA family of sensors.

Timeline
 October 30, 2006 - Rannoch Corporation announced the acquisition of ERA a.s. located in Pardubice Czech Republic.
 February 6, 2007 – Rannoch Corporation has officially changed its name to Era Corporation.
 July 2008 - Era Corporation was acquired by SRA International.
 November 22, 2011 - ERA Pardubice was bought by Czech arms and aircraft trading company Omnipol.

Users

 
  Estonia
  Indonesia
  Malaysia
  Pakistan
  Slovakia
  Vietnam
  United States

See also
General topic
ELINT/ESM

Similar systems
Kolchuga – a similar system developed in Ukraine
Kopáč – the first generation Czech ESM TDOA system
Ramona – the second generation Czech ESM TDOA system
Tamara – the third generation Czech ESM TDOA system
BORAP – a contemporary Czech ESM triangulation system
YLC-20 - a Chinese development of Czech Tamara first revealed in 2006

Similarly abbreviated electronics
Vision electronic recording apparatus, more commonly known as VERA

References

External links
ERA Company
PDF company presentation
Czech ESM/EW unit site

Radiofrequency receivers